John James Dyer (July 26, 1809 – September 14, 1855) was a United States district judge of the United States District Court for the District of Iowa.

Education and career

Born on July 26, 1809, in Franklin, Virginia (now West Virginia), Dyer graduated from Staunton Law School in Virginia in 1833. He entered private practice in Pendleton County, Virginia (now West Virginia) from 1833 to 1845. He was a commonwealth attorney for Pendleton County until 1845. He resumed private practice in Dubuque, Iowa Territory (State of Iowa from December 28, 1846) from 1845 to 1847.

Federal judicial service

Dyer was nominated by President James K. Polk on February 8, 1847, to the United States District Court for the District of Iowa, to a new seat authorized by 5 Stat. 789. He was confirmed by the United States Senate on March 3, 1847, and received his commission the same day. His service terminated on September 14, 1855, due to his death in Woodstock, Virginia.

References

Sources
 

1809 births
1855 deaths
19th-century American lawyers
County and city Commonwealth's Attorneys in Virginia
Iowa lawyers
Judges of the United States District Court for the District of Iowa
People from Dubuque, Iowa
People from Franklin, West Virginia
United States federal judges appointed by James K. Polk
19th-century American judges
Virginia lawyers
19th-century American politicians